is a passenger railway station located in the city of Ōme, Tokyo, Japan, operated by the East Japan Railway Company (JR East).

Lines
Hinatawada Station is served by the Ōme Line, located 21.4 kilometers from the terminus of the line at Tachikawa Station.

Station layout
This station consists of a single side platform serving a single bi-directional track. The station is unattended.

Platform

History
Hinatawada Station opened on 28 December 1895. It was nationalized in 1944. It became part of the East Japan Railway Company (JR East) with the breakup of the Japanese National Railways in 1987.

Passenger statistics
In fiscal 2014, the station was used by an average of 893 passengers daily (boarding passengers only).

Surrounding area
 Japan National Route 411
 Tama River

See also
 List of railway stations in Japan

References

External links 

 JR East Station information (JR East) 

Railway stations in Tokyo
Ōme Line
Stations of East Japan Railway Company
Railway stations in Japan opened in 1895
Ōme, Tokyo